Ed Hannigan (born August 6, 1951) is an American comics artist, writer, and editor for both Marvel Comics and DC Comics.

Career
Ed Hannigan's first credited comics story was published in Marvel Comics' licensed Planet of the Apes #5 (Feb. 1975). His writing credits include work on The Defenders from issue #67 (Jan. 1979) to #91 (Jan. 1981). Hannigan started as the series' artist but, while working on the story arc in issues #66 to #68, "I got in a pinch ... and asked [Hannigan] to help me," writer David Anthony Kraft recalled. "He felt self-conscious ... but I told him he'd be fine. He eventually got into it." Hannigan found it too difficult to both write and draw the series, so by the end of the story arc he was working solely as writer. As the artist on The Spectacular Spider-Man, Hannigan  and writer Bill Mantlo co-created the characters Cloak and Dagger, who appeared in a live-action television series on Freeform.

At DC Comics, Hannigan redesigned the Brainiac character into a chromed, more robotic form. He pencilled the covers on Batman in a lengthy run that spanned the majority of 1983–1985 with Don Newton providing the interior art. Hannigan and writer Mike Grell launched the first Green Arrow ongoing series in February 1988. The Batman: Legends of the Dark Knight series began in November 1989 with the five-part "Shaman" storyline by Hannigan and writer Dennis O'Neil. He both wrote and illustrated the three-issue prestige format series Skull & Bones for DC in 1992.

Personal life
Hannigan and his wife Heidi are the parents of Jean Anne, born in 1989.

In January 2010, Marvel Comics and The Hero Initiative published Ed Hannigan: Covered a fundraising effort to assist with Hannigan's medical expenses due to multiple sclerosis.

Bibliography

DC Comics

 Action Comics #666 (penciller) (1991) 
 The Adventures of Superman #479, Annual #5 (penciller) (1991–1993) 
 Aquaman Annual #2 (penciller) (1996) 
 Atari Force #16, 19 (penciller) (1985)
 Batman: Legends of the Dark Knight #1–5 (penciller) (1989–1990)  
 Deathstroke, the Terminator #39–40 (artist) (1994) 
 Green Arrow vol. 2 #1–6, 9–12, 15–16, 19–20, Annual #2 (penciller) (1988–1989) 
 Hawkman vol. 2 #17 (penciller) (1987) 
 Heroes Against Hunger #1 (writer) (1986) 
 League of Justice #1–2 (writer/penciller) (1996) 
 The New Teen Titans Annual vol. 2 #1 (penciller) (1985) 
 Showcase '93 #1–4 (Catwoman) (penciller) (1993) 
 Skull & Bones #1–3 (writer/artist) (1992) 
 Superman #408 (plotter) (1985) 
 Superman vol. 2 #56 (penciller) (1991)

Marvel Comics

 The Amazing Spider-Man Annual #17 (penciller) (1983) 
 Black Panther #13–15 (writer) (1979) 
 The Defenders #58–61, 66 (penciller); #67 (writer/penciller), #68, 70–75, 78–91 (writer) (1978–1981)
 Giant-Size Man-Thing #4–5 (penciller) (1975) 
 Kull the Destroyer #16–20 (penciller) (1976–1977) 
 Marvel Premiere #42 (Tigra); #51–53 (Black Panther) (writer) (1978–1980)
 Marvel Preview #4 (penciller) (1976) 
 Planet of the Apes #5 (penciller) (1975) 
 Power Man and Iron Fist #54–55 (writer) (1978–1979) 
 Son of Satan #6 (penciller) (1976)
 The Spectacular Spider-Man #60–62, 64, 66–67, 69–70, 72 (penciller) (1981–1982)  
 Star Trek #17 (penciller) (1981)

References

External links

Ed Hannigan at Mike's Amazing World of Comics
Ed Hannigan at the Unofficial Handbook of Marvel Comics Creators

1951 births
20th-century American artists
21st-century American artists
American comics artists
American comics writers
Comic book editors
DC Comics people
Living people
Marvel Comics people
People with multiple sclerosis
Role-playing game artists